The Jožef Stefan Institute (IJS, JSI) is the largest research institute in Slovenia. The main research areas are physics, chemistry, molecular biology, biotechnology, information technologies, reactor physics, energy and environment. At the beginning of 2013 the institute had 962 employees, of whom 404 were PhD scientists.

The mission of the Jožef Stefan Institute is the accumulation and dissemination of knowledge at the frontiers of natural science and technology for the benefit of society at large through the pursuit of education, learning, research, and development of high technology at the highest international levels of excellence.

History
The institute was founded by the State Security Administration (Yugoslavia) in 1949 for atomic weapons research. Initially, the Vinča Nuclear Institute in Belgrade was established in 1948, followed by the Ruđer Bošković Institute in Zagreb in 1950 and the Jožef Stefan Institute as an Institute for Physics in the Slovenian Academy of Sciences and Arts. It is named after the distinguished 19th century physicist Josef Stefan, best known for his work on the Stefan–Boltzmann law of black-body radiation.

IJS is involved in a wide variety of fields of scientific and economic interest. After close to 60 years of scientific achievement, the institute has become part of the image of Slovenia.

Over the last 60 years it has created a number of important institutions, such as the University of Nova Gorica, the Jožef Stefan International Postgraduate School and the Ljubljana Technology park.

Departments
Physics
F1 Theoretical Physics
F2 Low and Medium Energy Physics
F3 Thin Films and Surfaces
F4 Surface Engineering and Optoelectronics
F5 Condensed Matter Physics
F7 Complex Matter
F8 Reactor Physics

Chemistry and Biochemistry
B1 Biochemistry and Molecular Biology
B2 Molecular and Biomedical Sciences
B3 Biotechnology
K1 Inorganic Chemistry and Technology
K3 Physical and Organic Chemistry
K5 Electronic Ceramics
K6 Engineering Ceramics
K7 Nanostructured Materials
K8 Synthesis of Materials K8
K9 Advanced Materials
O2 Environmental Sciences
Electronics and Information Technologies
E1 Automation, Biocybernetics and Robotics
E2 Systems and Control
E3 Artificial Intelligence
E5 Open Computer Systems and Networks
E6 Communication Systems
E7 Computer Systems
E8 Knowledge Technologies
E9 Intelligent Systems
Reactor Engineering and Energetics
R4 Reactor Engineering
Centers
Centre for Knowledge Transfer in Information Technologies

Networking Infrastructure Centre

Reactor Infrastructure Centre
Scientific Information Centre Library
Center for Technology Transfer and Innovation

Campuses
The institute has facilities in two locations. The main facilities and the headquarters are on Jamova 39 in Ljubljana, the other location is the institute's Podgorica Reactor Center located in Brinje, Dol pri Ljubljani near Ljubljana.

Research reactor

The institute's Podgorica Reactor Center is home to a pool type research reactor. The General Atomics TRIGA Mark II reactor is rated for a nominal 250 kW thermal. The reactor was first licensed in 1966 and is expected to continue operation at least into the 2030s.

The Central Radioactive Waste Storage of Slovenia is co-located at the institute's reactor facility. This facility is used for storage of the low and intermediate level solid radioactive waste from the Podgorica Reactor Center and other, non-institute small waste producers such as medical, research, and industrial applications of ionising radiation.

Selection of online services from the institute 

VideoLectures.Net Collection of videos of scientific events
AnswerArt Question Answering system
SearchPoint Contextual Web Search

References

External links 

Research institutes in Slovenia
Biochemistry research institutes
Organizations established in 1949
Physics institutes
Biological research institutes
Energy research institutes
Environmental research institutes
Computer science institutes
Nuclear research institutes
Vič District
Scientific organizations in Ljubljana
1949 establishments in Slovenia